Unionism may refer to:

Trades
Community unionism, the ways trade unions work with community organizations
Craft unionism, a model of trade unionism in which workers are organised based on a particular craft or trade
Dual unionism, the development of a union or political organization parallel to and within an existing labor union
Industrial unionism, a labor union organizing method in which all workers in the same industry are organized into the same union
New Unionism, a term which has been used twice in the history of the labour movement to describe moves to broaden the union agenda
Open-source unionism, a term coined by academics Richard B. Freeman and Joel Rogers to explain a possible new model for organizing workers
Social Movement Unionism, a trend of theory and practice in contemporary trade unionism
Solidarity unionism, a model of labour organizing in which the workers themselves formulate strategy and take action
The organization of workers in trade unions

Politics 
 Preference for maintaining a political union as opposed to separatism 
 Unionism in Belgium
 Union (American Civil War)
Ittihadism, ideology of the Committee of Union and Progress in the Ottoman Empire 
 Movement for the unification of Romania and Moldova, advocates are referred to as "Unionists"
Albanian unionism
 Serbian–Montenegrin unionism
 Spanish unionism
 United Ireland

In the British isles
 Unionism in the United Kingdom, support for the UK constituent countries remaining part of the United Kingdom state 
 Unionism in Ireland, support for Ireland (mainly Northern Ireland) being part of the UK, rather than a Republic of Ireland or an independent Northern Ireland
 Unionism in Scotland, support for Scotland remaining part of the UK
 Unionism in England, support for England remaining part of the UK
 Unionism in Wales, support for Wales remaining part of the UK

Education 
The organization of students in students' unions
Voluntary student unionism, a policy under which membership of student unions is voluntary

Religion
 Christian ecumenism, initiatives aimed at worldwide Christian unity

See also 

Unification (disambiguation)
Unionist (disambiguation)
Union (disambiguation)